Kushal Pal Singh (born 15 November 1931) is an Indian billionaire real estate developer, and the chairman and CEO of real estate developer DLF Limited, founded by his father-in-law Chaudhary Raghvender Singh.

In 2008, he was ranked the 8th richest person in the world in Forbes 2008. His autobiography, named Whatever the Odds: The Incredible Story Behind DLF, was published in 2011; Jack Welch spoke at the launch. According to Forbes India Rich list of 2019, he is the 25th richest Indian.

Early life and career 
K.P. Singh was born on 15 November 1931 in Bulandshahr, Uttar Pradesh. His father, Chaudhary Mukhtar Singh, was a reputed lawyer in Bulandshahr. After graduating in science from Meerut College, Uttar Pradesh, he pursued aeronautical engineering in the UK and was subsequently selected to the Indian Army by British Officers Services Selection Board, UK. He was commissioned into the Deccan Horse in 1951. In 1960 he joined American Universal Electric Company and, soon after its merger with DLF Universal Limited in 1979, he took over as the managing director with Chaudhary Raghuvender Singh.

Activities 
Kushal Pal Singh constructed numerous earthquake-proof office buildings, apartments, shopping malls and leisure facilities in Gurgaon. While he was the chairman of DLF, the company went for an initial public offering (IPO) in 2007 and made about US$2.24 billion, one of the largest IPOs in India. Market capitalisation of the company increased to $24.5 billion, making Singh and his family one of the richest clans in the world. Jack Welch, the former chairman and CEO of General Electric, said in an interview that Singh was one of the initiators for GE's entry into India.

Awards and recognitions 

 Decoration of Officer of the Order of St. Charles, on 4 October 2010, conferred by Prince Albert II of Monaco for his contributions as Honorary Consul General of Monaco in Delhi for the previous two decades.
 Padma Bhusan Award, on 26 January 2010, conferred by Government of India.
 Recognition by Forbes magazine as the richest real estate baron and eighth richest person in the world, on 24 March 2008.
 The Samman Patra Award, in 2000, conferred by Government of India for being one of the top taxpayers of Delhi region.
 Delhi Ratna Award, conferred by Government of Delhi for his valuable contribution towards the development of Delhi.
 A special award conferred by NDTV, at the Indian of the Year Award Function held on 17 January 2008, for his contribution towards growth of Indian economy.
 In 2011 he received the Entrepreneur of the Year award at The Asian Awards.

Personal life and family
Singh is married to Indira Singh, the daughter of Raghvendra Singh, the founder of DLF Limited. K.P. Singh has one son, Rajiv Singh, and two daughters, Renuka Talwar and Pia Singh.

Singh's son, Rajiv Singh, succeeded him as the chairman of the DLF group in 2020. Rajiv's wife Kavita Singh became an advisor to DLF Commercial Developers Ltd in November 2002. She was also appointed Advisor to DLF Universal Ltd. on 1 June 2011, with a retainership fee of Rs 250,000 per month and other benefits. Rajiv and Kavita have two daughters, both of whom work for the company. K.P. Singh's elder daughter Renuka is married to G.S. Talwar, a non-executive director at DLF Ltd. Their son, Rahul, has joined DLF India Ltd as a "senior management trainee." K.P. Singh's younger daughter Pia Singh is a full-time director with DLF.

Controversy 
In April 2016, Singh's name featured in the list of high-profile names released in the Panama Papers, a set of 11.5 million confidential documents created by the Panamanian corporate service provider Mossack Fonseca. Singh's son Rajiv Singh, his wife, his daughter Pia Singh, and her husband Timmy Sarna all set up offshore companies in the British Virgin Islands through Mossack Fonseca, and are named in the Panama Papers.

References

1931 births
Living people
Indian chief executives
Indian billionaires
People from Bulandshahr
People from Gurgaon
Recipients of the Padma Bhushan in trade and industry
People named in the Panama Papers
Indian real estate businesspeople
20th-century Indian businesspeople
Businesspeople from Uttar Pradesh